Wilhelm Baum (born 1948 in Düsseldorf, Germany) is an Austrian historian, theologian, philosopher and publisher.

Biography 
He studied history, German language, and theology in Innsbruck, Rome, Mainz and Tübingen (two of his professors were Ernst Bloch and Hans Küng). In 1971, he became a doctor of philosophy and in 1999 in Graz a doctor of theology. In 1995, he taught medieval history at the university of Klagenfurt and at Karl-Franzens-Universität Graz. Now he lives in Klagenfurt, Austria, and works as a chief of a publishing house Kitab-Verlag, which he founded in 1999. He's a member of PEN club.

Bibliography 
He wrote books about Ludwig Wittgenstein and Karl Popper (translated into  Spanish and Slovene) and studied the history of Christianity in the Near East and in India (Nestorian and the western-Syrian "monophysite" church). He wrote books and articles about history of Slovenes living in Carinthia. He is interested in minorities.

The following Baum's books were translated into English:
 
 Shirin. Christian - Queen - Myth of Love. A woman of late antiquity - Historical reality and literary effect (2004) 
 Anton Kolig and Franz Wiegele. The Austrian painters of the "Nötsch circle" and Vienna about 1900 (2005)

Austrian publishers (people)
20th-century Austrian historians
German emigrants to Austria
Writers from Düsseldorf
1948 births
Living people
Academic staff of the University of Graz